Wilson v. Southwest Airlines Co., 517 F. Supp. 292 (N.D. Tex. 1981) is a US employment discrimination law case concerning bona fide occupational qualifications. Title VII of the Civil Rights Act of 1964 is a federal law that prohibits employment discrimination based on race, color, religion, sex or national origin. The law contains an exception in the case of bona fide occupational qualifications, allowing business to hire on the basis of religion, sex, or national origin in instances where it is a qualification that is reasonably needed and necessary for its operations. Bona fide occupational qualifications are qualities or attributes that employers are allowed to consider when hiring employees that are often illegal and considered discrimination to utilize in other circumstances.

Facts 
In the 1970s, Southwest Airlines marketed itself with “feminine spirit, fun and sex appeal.” Calling itself the "love airline," the flight attendants wore hot pants and go-go boots and handed out free drinks that they called "love potions." As part of this image, Southwest employed only women as flight attendants and ticketing agents. At the time the case was decided, Southwest was the only major airline in the United States that refused to hire men as flight attendants and ticketing agents. Plaintiff Gregory Wilson and a class of over 100 male job applicants challenged Southwest Airlines's refusal to hire men as violation of Title VII of the Civil Rights Act of 1964 and alleged that Southwest's height and weight requirements for flight attendants excluded a higher proportion of male applicants than female applicants. Southwest argued that its female employees were key to their success as a company and that their choice to employ them fell under the bona fide occupation qualification exception in Section 703(e)(1) of the Civil Rights Act of 1964.

Judgment 
The Court rejected Southwest's bona fide occupational qualification defense, finding that even though Southwest's marketing relied on sexual titillation, their decision to hire only women in certain roles was not permissible. The Court held that being a woman was not a necessary qualification to perform the duties required of flight attendants and ticketing agents and that Southwest's desire to continue their successful marketing campaign was not a business necessity that trumped federal law. The Court reasoned that recognizing a sex based bona fide occupational qualification would lead to other employers discriminating against potential employees by using sex or sex appeal as a qualification for any job that required public facing contact where customers preferred employees of a single sex. The Court held that to rule otherwise would undermine Congress’ stated purpose of preventing employers from “refusing to hire an individual based on stereotyped characterization of the sexes.”

Significance 
Although the analysis in Wilson treats the bona fide occupational qualification exception and the business necessity defense as one thing, the Supreme Court treated them as separate and distinct tests in United Automobile Workers v. Johnson Controls, Inc. The Equal Employment Opportunity Commission (EEOC) has stated that bona fide occupational qualifications are not warranted in situations such as: refusal to hire a woman because of her sex based on assumptions about employment characteristics of women in general; refusal to hire an individual based on stereotyped characterizations of the sexes; and the preferences of co-workers, employers, clients or customers. Some states have adopted similar laws that allow exceptions for bona fide occupational qualifications.

Notes 

Wikipedia Student Program
United States employment discrimination case law
Southwest Airlines